EMI (Extension: Easy Monthly Installment - Liya Hai Toh Chukana Padega!) is a 2008 Bollywood social comedy film directed by Saurabh Kabra and starred Sanjay Dutt, Arjun Rampal, Urmila Matondkar and Malaika Arora.

Synopsis
Sattar (Sanjay Dutt), owner of Good Luck Recovery Agency, is the saviour and the solution for all those caught in the debt trap. From Bhaigiri to business to politics to social work—that's how Sattar wants to progress in life. He has already graduated from Bhaigiri to business and is now eager to jump into politics.

Most sought after by banks, telecom companies and various multinationals, today his Good Luck Recovery Agency is a leading recovery agency. Sattar follows a simple rule when it comes to his business—Loan liya hai to chukana padega.

Reception
EMI received mostly negative reviews with The Economic Times saying that its release timing is apt but EMI 'fails to generate interest for its juvenile outlook towards the issue.' Hindustan Times also panned the movie giving it 1.5 stars out of 5 and commenting that "Sanjay Dutt is repeating his Munnabhai act till he makes your toes curl." This film was declared disaster at box office India.

Cast
 Sanjay Dutt as Sattar Bhai
 Arjun Rampal as Ryan Briganza
 Ashish Chaudhary as Anil Sharma
 Urmila Matondkar as Prerna Joshi
 Malaika Arora as Nancy Briganza (Ryan's girlfriend)
 Neha Oberoi as Shilpa Sharma
 Snehal Dabi as Sattar Bhai's crew member
 Manoj Joshi as Prem Prakash Patel
 Kulbhushan Kharbanda as Chandrakant Desai
 Daya Shankar Pandey as GaffurBhai
 Neha Mehta as Prerna's friend

Soundtrack 
 "Vote For Sattar Bhai" - Ninaad Kaamat 
 "Chori Chori" - Sunidhi Chauhan, Suzanne D'Mello
 "Aankhon Hi Aankhon Mein" - Mohit Chauhan
 "Aaja Aa Bhi Ja" - Shaan, Suzan, Rishi
 "Chori Chori" Remix - Sunidhi Chauhan, Suzanne D'Mello
 "EMI" - Sanjay Dutt, Mahalakshmi Iyer, SuZan, Earl 
 "EMI" Remix - Sanjay Dutt, Mahalakshmi Iyer, SuZan, Earl 
 "Roshan Har Dil" - Neisha, Joy, Paarthiv

References

External links
 

2000s Hindi-language films
2008 films
Balaji Motion Pictures films